Abe Knoop (born 28 August 1963 in Curaçao) is a Dutch professional football goalkeeping coach. He is currently the goalkeeping coach of the Iran national football team under the wing of Afshin Ghotbi.

During his playing career, Knoop was primarily used as a reserve goalkeeper, but he made a few Eredivisie appearances for Feyenoord and Vitesse.

References

1963 births
Living people
Dutch footballers
Curaçao footballers
Eredivisie players
Eerste Divisie players
AFC Ajax players
SBV Vitesse players
Feyenoord players
FC Wageningen players
Association football goalkeepers
Dutch football managers
People from Willemstad